Jacques Drouin (28 May 1943 – 28 August 2021) was a Canadian animator and director most known for his pinscreen animation.

Biography
Jacques Drouin was born in Mont-Joli, Quebec. He studied at the École des Beaux-Arts de Montréal for several years before leaving to study filmmaking at the UCLA in California.

He first encountered the pinscreen at an animation exhibition in 1967. By the early 1970s, he was an apprentice at the National Film Board of Canada and experimenting with this unique form of animation. His first film, Three Exercises on Alexeieff's Pinscreen, was released in 1974.

Until his death, Jacques Drouin continued making pinscreen animation films for the National Film Board of Canada, one of the only animators in the world to still use this difficult but rewarding process. Some of his short films are available on NFB DVD collections, and a few are available online. His film, A Hunting Lesson, was included in the Animation Show of Shows.

Filmography
 1974 - Three Exercises on Alexeieff's Pinscreen (Trois exercices sur l'écran d'épingles d'Alexeieff)
 1976 - Mindscape (Le paysagiste)
 1986 - Nightangel (fr: L'Heure des anges, cz: Romance z temnot) - a collaboration with Bretislav Pojar.
 1988 - A Sun Between Two Clouds (Un soleil entre deux nuages) - participated as an animator.
 1990 - Nathaël and the Seal Hunt (Nathaël et la chasse aux phoques)
 1991 - The Four Horsemen of the Apocalypse (Les Quatre cavaliers de l'apocalypse) - participated as an animator
 1993 - MTV Push Pins
 1994 - Ex-Child (Ex-enfant)
 1996 - My Life Is a River (Une vie comme rivière) - participated as an animator.
 2001 - A Hunting Lesson (Une leçon de chasse) - adaptation of tale by Jacques Godbout.
 2003 - Winter Days (冬の日) - collaboration with many other famous animators
 2004 - Imprints (Empreintes)

Awards
 1976 - Ottawa International Animation Festival Special Jury Prize for Mindscape

See also
 Alexandre Alexeieff and Claire Parker
 Pinscreen animation

References

External links
 
 Films by Jacques Drouin at the National Film Board of Canada

1943 births
2021 deaths
Canadian animated film directors
French Quebecers
Film directors from Montreal
National Film Board of Canada people
Pinscreen animation
People from Bas-Saint-Laurent
UCLA Film School alumni
École des beaux-arts de Montréal alumni